Para powerlifting at the 2018 Commonwealth Games was held at the Carrara Sports and Leisure Centre in the Gold Coast, Australia on April 10. A total of 2 men's and 2 women's events were contested.

Medal table

Medalists

Participating nations
There are 11 participating nations in para powerlifting with a total of 33 athletes. The number of athletes a nation entered is in parentheses beside the name of the country.

Notes

References

External links
 Results Book – Powerlifting

 
2018 Commonwealth Games events
2018
2018 in weightlifting
Weightlifting in Australia